Wind rights are rights relating to windmills, wind turbines and wind power. Historically in Continental Europe wind rights were manorial rights and obligations relating to the operation and profitability of windmills. In modern times, as wind becomes a more important source of power, rights relating to wind turbines and windmills are sometimes referred to as "wind rights".

Low Countries 

Historically, "wind rights" (Dutch: windrecht) referred to a tax paid by millers in large parts of the Low Countries before around 1800. The tax was paid on the "wind catch" (windvang) needed to turn a windmill, but it was often based on the windmill's output.

Since a windmill in a heerlijkheid was primarily the property of the lord (although leased out to a miller), wind rights were one way for a lord to discourage competition. In consideration for payment of this tax, the lord ensured that there were no wind obstructions around the mill by imposing a prohibition on buildings and high trees in the area. Another obligation imposed on residents was the "mill obligation" (molendwang), which required them to have their grain ground at the lord's mill. To a certain extent, this was another way for a lord to safeguard the income received from the mill.

Because of these rights and obligations, windmills had to be identifiable. They each had a name, traditionally the name of an animal. An image of the animal was placed on the mill so that even the illiterate would know which mill was which.

In the Netherlands, wind rights and the mill obligations were ended around 1800 when a new constitution was introduced in the Batavian Republic. Similar concepts still exist in modern times. Since around 1973 the wind needed to turn a mill has been referred to as the "windmill biotope" (molenbiotoop). An area of  around a windmill is maintained as a "free zone" so that the windmill can have enough wind. For polder windmills, ensuring that windmills have enough wind is the responsibility of the water board (waterschap or hoogheemraadschap). However, this seldom takes priority over the desire of municipalities to build new housing.

United States 

In Minnesota, as a result of the increased interest in wind energy, developers or utilities purchase “wind rights" from landowners to allow the installation of one or more wind generators and an access road to the equipment in exchange for a payment to the landowner.

References 

Footnotes

Citations

Windmills
Wind power
Rights
Legal history of the Netherlands
Law of the Netherlands
Legal history of Belgium
Law of Belgium